The Horch 853 Voll & Ruhrbeck Sport Cabriolet is a cabriolet automobile produced by German auto manufacturer Horch.

History 

The history of the car remains a mystery. During the war, the Allied bombers destroyed the  plant, and along with it the Horch 853 documentation. The car was captured by the French government and fell into the hands of French army Marshal Jean de Lattre de Tassigny. In the post-war period, the car was moved to Switzerland, after which it changed owners multiple times and was restored.

Technical specifications 
The Horch 853 is equipped with a straight 8-cylinder engine with a capacity of 4944 cc that produces . It features a 4-speed manual gearbox and is rear wheel drive.

See also 

 Horch 853A Special Roadster Erdmann & Rossi
 Alfa Romeo 8C
 Bugatti Type 57C Vanvooren
 Bugatti Type 57C Voll & Ruhrbeck
 Rolls-Royce Phantom Aerodynamic Coupe
 Bentley Embiricos
Cadillac V-16 Hartmann Cabriolet

References

External links 
supercars.net 1937 Horch 853A Spezialcabriolet
ultimatecarpage.com Horch 853 Voll & Ruhrbeck Sport Cabriolet

853
Auto Union
Audi
Cars introduced in 1937
Zwickau